Shandy Hall is a writer's house museum in the former home of the Rev. Laurence Sterne in Coxwold, North Yorkshire, England. Sterne lived there from 1760 to 1768 as perpetual curate of Coxwold. He is remembered for his novels The Life and Opinions of Tristram Shandy, Gentleman and A Sentimental Journey Through France and Italy.

Architectural history

The extant buildings result from three major phases of building: a medieval long hall built for the local priest around 1430; this was extended in the 17th century and then significantly altered by Sterne with the income from his novels. A stone tablet above its doorway states that Sterne wrote Tristram Shandy and A Sentimental Journey at Shandy Hall. This is not entirely accurate, for two volumes of Tristram Shandy had already been published in 1759 before Sterne moved to Coxwold.

The house is a Grade I listed building.  It was extended and altered internally for Sterne and subject to restoration in 1960.  The Hall is now administered by the Laurence Sterne Trust, a registered charity, and is open to the public. Shandy Hall featured in the 2006 film A Cock and Bull Story, which was based on Sterne's book Tristram Shandy.

Gallery

References

External links

The Laurence Sterne Trust – official site
TristramShandyWeb see the section dedicated to Shandy Hall (with images)

Country houses in North Yorkshire
Gardens in North Yorkshire
Biographical museums in North Yorkshire
Grade I listed buildings in North Yorkshire
Historic house museums in North Yorkshire
Literary museums in England